Fletcher Blaisdell Farm Complex is a historic farm complex located at Coeymans in Albany County, New York.  The complex includes the farmhouse (1837), hay barn (1878), corn crib (c. 1870),  smoke house (c. 1840), tenant house (c. 1830), small barn (c. 1870), and shed / chicken coops (c. 1870).  The farmhouse is a -story, three-by-three-bay, gable-fronted, side hall plan Greek Revival–style dwelling with south and east wings added.

It was listed on the National Register of Historic Places in 2001.

References

Farms on the National Register of Historic Places in New York (state)
Houses on the National Register of Historic Places in New York (state)
Houses completed in 1837
Houses in Albany County, New York
National Register of Historic Places in Albany County, New York